Stinky tofu is a Chinese form of fermented tofu that has a strong odor. It is usually sold at night markets or roadside stands as a snack, or in lunch bars as a side dish, rather than in restaurants. Traditionally the dish is fermented in a brine with vegetables and meat, sometimes for months. Modern factory-produced stinky tofu is marinated in brine for one or two days to add odor.

Production
Unlike cheese, stinky tofu fermentation does not have a fixed formula for starter bacteria; wide regional and individual variations exist in manufacturing and preparation.

The traditional method of producing stinky tofu is to prepare a brine made from fermented milk, vegetables, and meat; the brine can also include dried shrimp, amaranth greens, mustard greens, bamboo shoots, and Chinese herbs. The brine fermentation can take as long as several months.

Modern factories often use quicker methods to mass-produce stinky tofu. Fresh tofu is marinated in prepared brine for only a day or two, especially for fried or boiled cooking purposes. The process only adds odor to the marinated tofu instead of letting it ferment completely.

Preparation

Stinky tofu can be eaten cold, steamed, stewed, or, most commonly, deep-fried, and it is often accompanied by chili sauce or soy sauce. The color varies from the golden, fried Zhejiang-style to the black, typical of Hunan-style stinky tofu.

From a distance, the odor of stinky tofu is said to resemble that of rotten garbage or smelly feet. Some people have compared it to the taste of blue cheese, while others have compared it to rotten meat. It is said that the more it smells, the better its flavor.

History 

According to a Chinese legend, a scholar named Wang Zhihe hailing from Huang Shan in Anhui Province invented stinky tofu during the Qing dynasty. After failing the imperial examination, Wang stayed in Beijing and relied on selling tofu to make a living. One day, having a huge quantity of unsold tofu on his hands, he cut the tofu into small cubes and put them into an earthen jar. After several days, he opened up the jar and found out that the tofu had turned greenish and become extremely smelly. Initially perceiving the tofu to taste extremely foul, he found out that it was surprisingly delicious so he decided to start selling it at his store. The stinky tofu that Wang Zhihe invented gained popularity and was later served at the imperial Qing Dynasty palace. The dish has now become extremely popular in Taiwan.

Chemical analysis
A 2012 chemical analysis found 39 volatile organic compounds that contributed to the unique smell and taste of fermented stinky tofu. The main volatile compound was indole, which has an intense fecal odor, followed by dimethyl trisulfide, phenol, dimethyl disulfide and dimethyl tetrasulfide.

Around the world

Hong Kong 
In Hong Kong, stinky tofu is a street food. It is deep-fried fresh at hawkers' stalls and at dai pai dongs and sold by the bag. Stinky tofu in Hong Kong is typically served deep-fried and eaten with hoisin sauce.

China

Stinky tofu is made and consumed in different ways in various areas of China. For example, the types of dried stinky tofu made in Changsha and Shaoxing are made using different methods, and the resulting flavors are very different. Huo Gong Dian (a stinky tofu shop in Changsha) makes the tofu with yellow soybeans marinated in seasoning. The stinky tofu sold in Tianjin is made mostly in the Nanjing style, with a mild aroma. In Shanghai, stinky tofu is fried and sold on the street, typically served with a spicy or sweet sauce much like the Shaoxing variety. It is also served as a condiment to congee, often as a part of a regular breakfast meal. In Chongqing, stinky tofu on the street is usually fried and dipped in a mixture of, typically, coriander (cilantro) leaves, scallions, chili powder, Sichuan pepper and oil. Stinky tofu is also sometimes dipped in Sichuan spicy hot pot. In Beijing, there is a form that is sold in jar as a curd.

In Anhui, the perceived deliciousness of stinky tofu depends mainly on its spiciness: the spicier it is, the more it suits the local favor. Chinese legend says that stinky tofu was invented by a man from Anhui province, and indeed it is common to attribute the creation of tofu dishes in general to Anhui cuisine, as Anhui is seen as the birthplace of tofu.

Changsha, Hunan 
Stinky tofu is a symbol of Changsha street snack, also called chou ganzi (smelly jerky) by local people. Changsha stinky tofu is famous of its spicy flavor. Different than Sichuan stinky tofu, Changsha-style has black crackling. Changsha stinky tofu is made from brine composed of winter bamboo shoot, koji, and shiitake mushrooms. After the surface grows white hair-like filaments, and once it turns grey, the stinky tofu is ready to be fried. Chopped mustard, chili, and shallot are regular toppings on Changsha stinky tofu. Along with Xiangtan lotus seeds and Yongfeng chili sauce, Changsha stinky tofu is known as "Hunan Sanbao" or one of Hunan's three treasures.

Nanjing, Jiangsu 
There is one famous kind of stinky tofu in Nanjing, called "Gaochun stinky tofu". It has different kinds of brine than Changsha style stinky tofu. The brine needs to be made of rotten pickles and its stinky smell will be very natural. Similar to Changsha-style stinky tofu, it also has black crackling.

Sichuan 
In Sichuan, stinky tofu is often flavored with mala, a spicy and numbing seasoning made from chilli and Sichuan peppercorns. Sichuan-style stinky tofu does not need to be deep fried in the oil, so it does not have black cracklings. It needs to be stirred fried and boiled with different kinds of spices.

Taiwan
In Taiwan, stinky tofu is commonly found at stalls in night markets. Taiwanese stinky tofu is cooked with many methods including frying, steaming, cooking in soup, and barbecuing, but is most commonly found in its fried form. The Shenkeng Old Street in New Taipei's Shenkeng District is known for having an entire boulevard dedicated to eateries serving Taiwanese varieties of stinky tofu.

Fried stinky tofu 
Fried stinky tofu is the most common variety found in Taiwanese night markets and is considered to be less pungent than other varieties. It is almost always served with pickled cabbage and garlic sauce.

Steamed stinky tofu 
Steamed stinky tofu in Taiwan is considered to be the most pungent variety of stinky tofu available. It is typically served with pickled cabbage, chili sauce, and garlic sauce.

Stewed stinky tofu 
Stewed stinky tofu is served in a thick soup. A Sichuan mala base is often used, but can vary. The spicy broth of a mala base is said to be able to mask the smell and taste of the tofu.

Barbecued stinky tofu 
Barbecued stinky tofu is a popular stinky tofu variety believed to have originated in Taipei's Shenkeng District, and is served in many of Taiwan's night markets. It is often described as have a nutty, smooth center and a spongy outer skin. Cubes of stinky tofu are speared on a bamboo skewer are roasted over charcoal with roasted meat sauce. Because of the huge amount of seasonings, the unpleasant odor of barbecued stinky tofu is comparatively weaker. Therefore, barbecued stinky tofu is always recommended for people trying stinky tofu for the first time.

United States
Stinky tofu can also be found in specialty restaurants in some parts of the United States (with preparation methods altered where needed to comply with U.S. food safety laws).

See also
 Fermented bean curd
 List of fermented soy products
 List of tofu dishes
 Specialty foods

References

External links
 

Tofu dishes
Chinese condiments
Chinese inventions
Deep fried foods
Fermented soy-based foods
Hong Kong cuisine
Hunan cuisine
Indonesian Chinese cuisine
Qing dynasty
Shanghai cuisine
Taiwanese cuisine